Anakapalli is a suburb of Visakhapatnam also the headquarters of Anakapalle district of Andhra Pradesh. In 2015 Anakapalli municipality was merged with the Greater Visakhapatnam Municipal Corporation . It falls under zone 7 of GVMC. India's second largest jaggery market is located over here.

History 
The town was originally under the rule of the Kalinga Empire (ancient Orissa), different dynasties ruled this region i.e. Chedi Kingdom of Kalinga (Orissa), Eastern Ganga dynasty of Orissa, Gajapati Kingdom of Orissa, Kakatiya, and Qutub Shahi empires. Around 1755, Kakarlapudi Appala Raju Payakarao took over the rule of the region under the Nawab of Arcot, with Anakapalli as his fortified headquarters. The saga of Anakapalli starts with a historian named "Tallapragada" place and found that Anakapalli. This was proved from the historical evidence found on Bojjana Konda. Satavahanas, Vishnukundina, Gajapathi's, Vijayanagara Samrats, Golkonda Samanta Rajulu ruled the area.

Its alias names are Aniankapalli, Anekaphalle, Vijaypuri, Veniapalii, Kanakapuri, Bellampatnam, Anakapally, and Anakapalli. It is located by the side of a holy Sarada River. During the Independence struggle of India, many prominent leaders like Mahatma Gandhi and Dr. B. R. Ambedkar visited Anakapalli. It is around 41 km km from Visakhapatnam.

Buddhist area 
One of the most significant Buddhist sites in Andhra Pradesh, Sankaram is located some 3.5 km away from Anakapalli and 41 km away from Visakhapatnam on the Sabbavaram by-pass road. The name Sankaram derives from the term Sangharama. Sankaram is famous for its many votive stupas, rock-cut caves, brick-built structural edifices, early historic pottery, and Satavahana coins that date back to the 1st century AD. The main stupa here was initially carved out of rock and then covered with bricks.

There you can see a number of images of the Buddha carved on the rock face of the caves. At Lingalametta, there are hundreds of rock-cut monolithic stupas in rows, spread all over the hill. Among other Buddhist attractions here are relic casket, three chaitya halls, votive platforms, stupas, and Vajrayana sculptures. The Vihara was functional for around a millennium and saw the development of the not only Theravada form of Buddhism but also Mahayana and Vajrayana Buddhism. Later Anakapalli went to the estate of Vavilavalasa Inuganty kings and ruled a long time.

Geography 

Demographics 
According to Imperial Gazetteer of India, Anakapalli had an area of  containing 143 villages.

As of the 2001 Indian census, Anakapalli had a population of 84,523. Males constitute 50% of the population and females 50%. Anakapalli has an average literacy rate of 67%, higher than the national average of 59.5%, with 54% of the males and 46% of females literate. 10% of the population is under 6 years of age.

Governance 
The municipal council was established in 1878.
MLA of this municipality is Sai Siva

Economy 

Agriculture mainly consists of the production of Rice, Corn, Sugarcane, and all types of vegetables. The chief crop cultivated in this region is sugarcane and Anakapalli is well known for its jaggery market, which is the second-largest in India. Velagapudi Steels own a steel mill near Anakapalli.

Notable temples
Kotilingam
Bojjannakonda
Nookambika Temple

Transport 

National Highway 16, a part of Golden Quadrilateral highway network, bypasses the town. Anakapalli railway station is on Howrah-Chennai mainline. It is under the Vijayawada division of the South Central Railway zone. APSRTC runs the buses all overstate. Vizag city buses run from Maddilapalem, Dwaraka Bus Station, Gajuwaka, Yelamanchili etc.

References 

Cities and towns in Anakapalli district